The 1955 State of the Union Address was given by the 34th president of the United States, Dwight D. Eisenhower, on Thursday, January 6, 1955, to the 84th United States Congress.  He said, "Every citizen wants to give full expression to his God-given talents and abilities and to have the recognition and respect accorded under our religious and political traditions." He also said, "To protect our nations and our peoples from the catastrophe of a "nuclear holocaust", free nations must maintain countervailing military power to persuade the Communists of the futility of seeking their ends through aggression."  He is referring to what seemed to be the high likelihood of nuclear warfare of the time.
He ended with, "And so, I know with all my heart--and I deeply believe that all Americans know--that, despite the anxieties of this divided world, our faith, and the cause in which we all believe, will surely prevail." This address was given in his first term (1953-1957), in Washington, D.C.

References

State of the Union addresses
Presidency of Dwight D. Eisenhower
Speeches by Dwight D. Eisenhower
84th United States Congress
State of the Union Address
State of the Union Address
State of the Union Address
State of the Union Address
January 1955 events in the United States